Morag Jeanette Loh (3 March 1935 – 7 February 2019) was an Australian writer, specializing in children's literature and Australian history.

Early life 
Morag Jeanette Foster was born in Melbourne and attended the University of Melbourne. Before 1974, she was a teacher.

Career

Books by Morag Loh 

 The Immigrants (1977), with Wendy Lowenstein
 Growing Up in Richmond (1979)
 With Courage in their Cases (1980)
 Children in Australia: An Outline History (1981), with Sue Fabian
 The Changemakers : Ten Significant Australian Women (1983), with Sue Fabian
 Stories and Storytellers from Indo-China (1985)
 Australian Children through 200 Years (1985), with Sue Fabian
 Survival and Celebration: An Insight into the Lives of Chinese Immigrant Women, European Women Married to Chinese and Their Female Children in Australia from 1856 to 1986 (1986), co-edited with Christine Wu Ramsay
 Dinky Di: The Contributions Of Chinese Immigrants And Australians Of Chinese Descent To Australia's Defence Forces And War Efforts 1899-1988 (1988), with Judith Winternitz
 Left-wing Ladies: The Union of Australian Women in Victoria, 1950-1998 (2000), with Sue Fabian.

Children's (picture) books by Morag Loh 

 The Kinder Hat (1985), with Donna Rawlins, illustrator
 Tucking Mummy In (1987), with Donna Rawlins, illustrator
 Grandpa and Ah Gong (1995), with Xiangyi Mo, illustrator

Loh also wrote plays, including Snail and the Hare (1983), Wu Sung Fights the Tiger (1983), Glimpses of Richmond (1983), Tombolas Go Historical (1985) and Right Royal Panto (1986). She said of her historical projects on immigration in Australia, "It is really an attempt to improve communication in Australian society. If it also educates people then that is fine, and certainly it is meant to be entertaining." She spoke at literary festivals, to community groups and schoolchildren.

Awards 
Loh's study of Chinese-Australian history was funded in part by a grant from the Australia-China Council. Her children's book, Grandpa and Ah Gong, won the 1995 Young Readers/Picture Book award from The Family Therapy Associations of Australia. In 2008 she was added to the Victorian Honour Roll of Women.

Personal life 
Morag Foster married surgeon Timothy Loh in 1958. She died in 2019, aged 83 years, in Melbourne.

References

External links 

1935 births
2019 deaths
Australian women writers
People from Melbourne
University of Melbourne alumni